Jay Richardson (born January 30, 1971) is an American politician who has been a member of the Arkansas House of Representatives from the 78th district in Sebastian County since 2019.

Political career
On January 15, 2019, shortly after taking office, Richardson and fellow newcomer state representative Megan Godfrey (D-Springdale), responded to Arkansas Governor Asa Hutchinson's State of the State address by issuing a statement urging him to not to go through with his proposed 5.9% tax cuts and instead allocate more taxpayer money for highways and expanding pre-kindergarten education. Speaking for the state Democrats, Richardson also urged Hutchinson to support the Democrats proposal for the creation of a Earned Income Tax Credit (EITC), which the Democrats believe would go further to help working families. He also stated that roads and pre-K education funding should come before top-end tax breaks.

During the 2020 COVID-19 pandemic, Richardson co-sponsored legislation which created a statewide COVID-19 Rainy Day Fund.

Elections
Richardson was elected unopposed in the general election on November 6, 2018. He also ran unopposed in the 2020 general election as well.

References

Richardson, Jay
African-American state legislators in Arkansas
Living people
21st-century American politicians
1971 births
21st-century African-American politicians
20th-century African-American people